The Kenana River is a river of the North Auckland Peninsula, in New Zealand's North Island. It is located in the north of the peninsula, and flows into Mangonui harbour, an inlet in the south of Doubtless Bay.

See also
List of rivers of New Zealand

References

Far North District
Rivers of the Northland Region
Rivers of New Zealand